Dullea is a surname. Notable people with the surname include:

Charles W. Dullea (1889–1966), Chief of San Francisco Police Department
Keir Dullea (born 1936), American actor